Akani Songsermsawad (born 10 September 1995), better known as Sunny Akani, is a Thai former professional snooker player.

Career

Early career
Akani, a regular in amateur Thai snooker events since 2011, first came to international attention with a 5–2 win over professional Matthew Selt in the Six-red World Championship, in 2008.

2015–2017
In 2015 he won the ACBS Asian Under-21 Snooker Championship, beating Yuan Sijun 6–4 in the final and as a result was given a two-year card on the professional World Snooker Tour for the 2015–16 and 2016–17 seasons. His first appearance in a ranking event qualifier came at the 2016 World Championship, where he was edged out 10–9 by compatriot Thepchaiya Un-Nooh in the opening round.

Akani qualified for the 2016 Indian Open by defeating Ben Woollaston 4–3 and then saw off Jamie Burnett 4–1, Mark Davis 4–2 and Gary Wilson 4–2 (opened the match with a 104 break) to reach the quarter-finals of the first ranking he had appeared at. He took a 2–1 lead over Kyren Wilson, but would go on to lose 4–2.
He also lost in the quarter-finals of the non-ranking Six-red World Championship 7–4 to Stuart Bingham. At the Northern Ireland Open, Akani eliminated Cao Yupeng 4–1 and Mark Davis 4–3 and was knocked out in the third round 4–2 by Wilson. He qualified for the German Masters by seeing off Graeme Dott and Jack Lisowski, but was thrashed 5–0 by Zhao Xintong in the first round. He stood one win away from playing in the World Championship after defeating Mei Xiwen 10–5 and Joe Perry 10–9, but was heavily beaten 10–3 by David Grace. Akani failed to break into the top 64 in the rankings during his two years on tour, but will stay on it by topping the one-year list.

2017–2018
In 2017, he started the season like the year before. He reached the Last 16 of the 2017 Indian Open after beating Scott Donaldson, Stephen Maguire, and Dominic Dale before losing 4–2 to Liam Highfield. At the 2017 World Open qualifying round, he had a close match against Liang Wenbo losing 5–4 after being 2–0 and 4–2 up and scoring back-to-back century breaks (101 and 119) but losing the "decider". At the 2017 International Championship, he was 2–0, 3–1 and 4–2 behind but he won the last 4 frames to beat Marco Fu by 6–4. In the last frame, he cleared the table with a break of 53 to win the frame by 2 points. After a walkover in the last 64, he lost against Martin O'Donnell 5–6, despite a lead of 5–2.

During the 2017 UK Championship, Akani defeated three higher seeds, defeating Fergal O'Brien 6–5, Michael Holt 6–4, and whitewashing former world championship runner-up Barry Hawkins 6–0. After the match, Hawkins said the match "was up there with one of the worst I have ever played". In the last 16, Akani drew Ronnie O'Sullivan and went ahead at scores of 2–0, 4–2 and 5–4, before losing the match 6–5. After the match O'Sullivan stated he believed Akani "deserved to win" and  "felt like (he) robbed him of victory".

The following competition, the 2017 Scottish Open, saw Akani lose in the first round to Jimmy White 4–1.

2018–2019 
Akani failed to qualify for the first ranking event of the season, losing 4-3 to Oliver Lines in the qualifying round of the 2018 Riga Masters. He beat Fan Zhengyi 6-5 to qualify for the 2018 World Open, where he was defeated 5-2 in the first round by Barry Hawkins. Akani reached the semi-finals of the non-ranking 2018 Haining Open, where he was defeated 4-2 by Li Hang. He followed this by the knockout stage of the non-ranking Six-red World Championship, coming through the round-robin stage by finishing second in Group E, scoring victories over Jimmy Robertson and Mohamed Khairy, and losing to group winner Ding Junhui. In the knockout stage, he beat Stephen Maguire and Mohammed Shehab 6-5 to reach the semi-finals, where he lost 7-5 to eventual champion Kyren Wilson.

Having failed to qualify for the Indian Open and European Masters, Akani's next ranking event was the 2018 China Championship, where he lost 5-3 in the first round to Mark Selby, who would go on to win the tournament. At the 2018 English Open, he defeated 8th seed Kyren Wilson 4-3 before losing 4-0 to Anthony McGill in the second round. Akani beat Soheil Vahedi 6-5 to qualify for the International Championship, where he defeated Mark Williams 6-3 and Zhou Yuelong 6-4 to reach the third round, where he lost 6-4 to Ali Carter. A 4-0 victory over Fan Zhengyi in first round of the 2018 Northern Ireland Open set up a second round tie with Xiao Guodong, which he lost 4-3.

Akani enjoyed another good showing at the 2018 UK Championship, defeating Eden Sharav and James Cahill 6-5, and winning 6-2 against Jak Jones to reach the last 16 for the second year running, where he lost 6-2 to Stuart Bingham. His next win at a ranking event came at the Shoot-Out, where he defeated Lyu Haotian and Billy Joe Castle before losing in the third round to amateur player Ryan Davies. Akani finished the season by failing to qualify for the 2019 World Championship, losing in the second round of qualifying 10-5 to Robert Milkins. He ended the season 52nd in the Snooker world rankings.

2021–2022 
In July, Akani contracted COVID-19, although was not withdrawn from any events. However, in an interview after losing in the 2022 European Masters, he revealed that he had Long COVID and was unable to practise for more than minutes, where normally he would be on the snooker table as much as he was able to be on it, This led to a significant dip in form throughout the 2021-22 season, placing his tour position at the end of season at risk.

Style of play
Akani is known for his very deliberate cue action, where he plants his hand down with the cue before playing the next shot. In the book 147 Snooker Drills and Exercises by Andrew Highfield, he named a challenge after Akani, after challenging him to complete the drill. He is also known for resting his chin on the cue extension when playing with a rest.

Performance and rankings timeline

Career finals

Amateur finals: 1 (1 title)

References

External links
Sunny Akani at worldsnooker.com

1995 births
Living people
Sunny Akani
Sunny Akani
Sunny Akani